Barclay is an unincorporated community in southwest Falls County, Texas, United States. Barclay, the southernmost community in Falls County, is located on Farm-to-market road 413. The estimated population was 58 in 2009.

References

Unincorporated communities in Falls County, Texas
Unincorporated communities in Texas